The 1840 United States presidential election in Missouri took place between October 30 and December 2, 1840, as part of the 1840 United States presidential election. Voters chose four representatives, or electors to the Electoral College, who voted for President and Vice President.

Missouri voted for the Democratic candidate, Martin Van Buren, over Whig candidate William Henry Harrison. Van Buren won Missouri by a margin of 13.26%.

Election Results

See also
 United States presidential elections in Missouri

References

Missouri
1840
1840 Missouri elections